The NCAA Division III Women's Soccer Championship is an American intercollegiate college soccer tournament conducted by the National Collegiate Athletic Association (NCAA) to determine the Division III national champion. It has been held annually since 1986 when the Division III championship was established for universities that do not award athletics scholarships. A third Division II championship was added in 1988.

Traditionally, the tournament is held in November and December of each year following the end of the regular season. Originally, the tournament finals were held on the campus of one of the teams participating in the semifinals. Since 2004, however, it has been held at a pre-determined neutral site. 

The most successful program has been Messiah, with six national titles. 

The current champion is Johns Hopkins, who won their first national title in 2022.

Champions

Cumulative results

See also
AIAW Intercollegiate Women's Soccer Championship
NCAA Women's Soccer Championships (Division I, Division II)
NCAA Men's Soccer Championships (Division I, Division II, Division III)
 NAIA Women's Soccer Championship
 Intercollegiate Soccer Football Association

Notes and references

External links
NCAA Division III women's soccer page

NCAA Division III women's soccer